Zoopigi is a village one kilometre north of Kalo Chorio in the Limassol District of Cyprus,

References

Communities in Limassol District